José Rafael Santiago Alfonso (born August 15, 1940) is a Puerto Rican former right-handed professional baseball pitcher. He played in Major League Baseball (MLB) from 1963 to 1970 for the Kansas City Athletics and Boston Red Sox.

Biography

Possessor of an outstanding curveball, Santiago reached the American League  in 1963 with the Kansas City Athletics. His contract was sold to the Boston Red Sox after the 1965 season, and he became a key member of  pitching staff of the 1967 Red Sox, posting a 12–4 record with a 3.59 ERA in 50 games. He was largely a middle relief pitcher that season, starting only 11 games, and compiled an 8–3 mark in relief with five saves. However, he also made several important starts, including Game 1 of the 1967 World Series, which he lost to Hall of Famer Bob Gibson, 2–1, accounting for the only Boston run with a home run in his first World Series plate appearance.

Although Santiago lost both of his World Series decisions to the St. Louis Cardinals and compiled an ERA of 5.59, he began the 1968 campaign in the Boston rotation, compiling a 9–4 record with a 2.25 ERA in 18 starts before an elbow injury ended his season. After that, he appeared in only 18 more games during 1969 and 1970, and never won another major league game.

Santiago ended his majors career with 163 appearances, 34 victories and 29 losses and an ERA of 3.74. He also was selected to the 1968 MLB All-Star Game.

In 1979, Santiago managed in a short-lived Class AAA circuit, the Inter-American League, as skipper of the Puerto Rico Boricuas. His club won 16 of 55 games (.291), ending sixth and last in the six-team league, and folded June 17. Thirteen days later, the entire league shut down.

After he retired, Santiago became a longtime play-by-play announcer for the Cangrejeros de Santurce of the Liga de Béisbol Profesional Roberto Clemente. For some time during the 1980s, Santiago was also a boxing promoter in Puerto Rico; several of his boxing promotions were televised locally. He was also a professional wrestling announcer during the 1980s.

Sources
Bucek, Jeanine, editorial director, The Baseball Encyclopedia: 10th Edition. New York: Macmillan USA, 1996.

References

Further reading
SABR Biography Project

External links
, or Pura Pelota (Venezuelan Winter League)

1940 births
Living people
Albuquerque Dukes players
American League All-Stars
Boston Red Sox players
Dallas Rangers players
Grand Island A's players
Kansas City Athletics players
Leones de Ponce players
Louisville Colonels (minor league) players
Major League Baseball pitchers
Major League Baseball players from Puerto Rico
Minor league baseball coaches
Minor league baseball managers
Navegantes del Magallanes players
Puerto Rican expatriate baseball players in Venezuela
Olean A's players
People from Juana Díaz, Puerto Rico
Portland Beavers players
Professional wrestling announcers
Senadores de San Juan players
Shreveport Sports players
Vancouver Mounties players
Visalia A's players